In some stories from Greek mythology, Itylus or Itylos (Ancient Greek: Ἴτυλος) was the son of Aedon, who was the daughter of Pandareus of Ephesus and the wife of King Zethus of Thebes.

In others, Itys was the son of Procne and Tereus.

Mythology 

Aedon was envious of Niobe, her sister-in-law, who had six sons and six daughters. Aedon planned to kill the eldest of Niobe's sons, but by mistake killed her own son Itylus. Zeus relieved her grief by changing her into a nightingale, whose songs are Aedon's lamentations about her child.

The story was an ancient one; for example, Homer's listeners were expected to know the allusion, when Penelope reveals to the still-disguised Odysseus her anguish: I lie on my bed, and the sharp anxieties swarmingthick and fast on my beating heart torment my sorrowing self.As when Pandareos' daughter, the greenwood nightingaleperching in the deep of the forest foliage sings outher lovely song when springtime is just begun, she varyingthe manifold strains of her voice, pours out the melodymourning Itylos, son of the lord Zethos, her own belovedchild, whom she once killed with the bronze, when the madness was upon her;So my mind is divided, and starts one way, then another. —Odyssey xix.519-24; Richard Lattimore's translation).

As one of only nine similes in the Odyssey that are longer than five lines, the thematic complexity of the image and its multiple points of contact with Penelope's situation has arrested the attention of many readers.

In an explanatory scholium on this passage, an anonymous scholiast, echoed by Eustathius, explains that Aedon attempted to kill Amaleus, the son of her sister-in-law and rival, Niobe, but accidentally killed her own son instead: thus, the gods changed her into a nightingale to weep for eternity. The setting of the episode is Thebes.

Attic authors later than Homer, including the dramatists, knew a different nightingale myth in which Procne was married to Tereus, who raped her sister Philomela. Tereus cut out Philomela's tongue so that she could not tell. (In some versions, Philomela is the name of the wife, Procne of her mutilated sister.) Philomela wove her story into a robe that she gave to Procne. In a fit of madness, Procne then murdered her own child by Tereus, Itys. All were changed to birds, though the specific birds vary; for example, in Ovid, Philomela is changed to a nightingale. For more details, see Philomela.

Notes

Metamorphoses characters
Characters in the Odyssey